NGC 920 is a barred spiral galaxy in the Andromeda constellation. The celestial object was discovered on September 11, 1885 by the American astronomer Lewis A. Swift.

See also 
 List of NGC objects (1–1000)

References

External links 
 

Barred spiral galaxies
920
Andromeda (constellation)
009377